The Eagle Has Landed – Part II is a double live album by the English heavy metal band Saxon. It is the fourth live album by the band and the first recording to feature Doug Scarratt instead of Graham Oliver, who had left just after the release of Dogs of War.

Track listing

Personnel
 Saxon
Biff Byford - vocals, producer
Paul Quinn - guitar
Doug Scarratt - guitar
Nibbs Carter - bass guitar
Nigel Glockler - drums
 Guest musicians
Yngwie Malmsteen - guitar on "Denim and Leather"
 Production
Rainer Hänsel - producer
Thomas Kukuck, Hans Jürgen Steffen - engineers

References

Saxon (band) live albums
1998 live albums
Virgin Records live albums